The Archdeacon of Hereford is a senior ecclesiastical officer in the Church of England Diocese of Hereford. The archdeacon is the senior priest with responsibility over the area of the archdeaconry of Hereford.

History
The first recorded archdeacons in Hereford diocese occur soon after the Norman Conquest (as they do across England) – there were apparently two archdeacons from the outset. However, no territorial titles are recorded until after . The archdeacons at that time were the Archdeacons of Hereford and of Shropshire (aka Salop but distinct from the Lichfield Salop archdeaconry); the latter was renamed Archdeacon of Ludlow in 1876.

List of archdeacons

High Medieval
Archdeacons in Hereford diocese:
bef. 1086–aft. 1101 (d.): Heinfrid
?–25 November 1120 (d.): Geoffrey
Archdeacons of Hereford:
bef. 1131–aft. 1179 (d.): Peter
bef. 1181–aft. 1196: Ralph Foliot
bef. 1198–5 September 1215 (deprived): William fitzWalter (excommunicated)
bef. 1215–?: Alexander de Walton
bef. 1216–bef. 1228: William de Ria
bef. 1234–aft. 1248: Henry Bustard
bef. 1258–bef. 1287 (res.): William of Conflans (Guillaume de Conflans; afterwards Bishop of Genève)
27 May 1287–bef. 1287 (res.): Roger of Sevenoaks (disputed)
21 November 1287–bef. 1303 (d.): Richard of Hertford

Late Medieval
1 June 1303 – 13 February 1318 (res.): Henry de Shorne
1318–aft. 1326: Thomas de Chaundos (Sr)
5 March 1333–bef. 1343: John de Barton
bef. 1343–bef. 1367 (d.): William de Sheynton
bef. 1369–2 April 1379 (res.): John de Bedwardine/Smythes
: Richard Tissington (claimant)
1389–bef. 1405 (res.): Richard Kingston (afterwards Dean of Windsor, 1412)
31 January 1405 – 5 May 1417 (exch.): John Loveney (afterwards Archdeacon of Shropshire)
5 May 1417–bef. 1424 (res.): John Hereford (previously Archdeacon of Shropshire)
21 July 1424 – 10 July 1446 (exch.): John Barowe
10 July 1446 – 1476 (d.): Richard Rudhale/Rudhall
bef. 1478–bef. 1485: Richard Martyn (also Archdeacon of Berkshire from 1478 and Archdeacon of London until 1482; Bishop of St David's from 1482)
bef. 1485–1494 (d.): Robert Geffrey/Jeffry (previously Archdeacon of Shropshire)
1494–bef. 1511 (d.): Thomas Morton (previously Archdeacon of Shropshire)
20 July 1511 – 1522 (d.): William Webb/Webbe (previously Archdeacon of Shropshire)
29 January 1523 – 1542 (d.): John Boothe

Early modern
14 August 1542 – 1552 (d.): John Styrmin
3 February 1552 – 1557 (res.): Richard Cheyney

27 July 1557 – 1559 (deprived): John Glazier (deprived)
24 March 1559 – 1567 (res.): Robert Crowley
5 April 1567 – 1578 (res.): Edward Cowper
1578–1606 (d.): Simon Smith
28 July 1606 – 1617 (exch.): Silvanus Griffiths
1617–1620 (res.): Richard Montagu
1623–6 June 1648 (d.): John Hughes
: Matthew Burst
1660–1684 (res.): George Benson
1684–1690 (deprived): Samuel Benson (deprived)
1690–2 February 1698 (d.): William Johnson
1698: Brian Turner (nominated, but died before installation)
1698–bef. 1729: Thomas Fox
1729–9 November 1741 (d.): John Walker
18 December 1741–bef. 1769: Robert Breton
19 January 1769–bef. 1787: John Harley (also Dean of Windsor from 1778)
1787–bef. 1823: James Jones
15 February 1823–bef. 1825: John Lilly
1825–bef. 1852 (res.): Henry Wetherell
1852–11 August 1863 (d.): Richard Lane Freer

Late modern
1863–26 May 1887 (d.): The 16th Baron Saye and Sele
1887–1910 (ret.): Berkeley Scudamore-Stanhope
1910–1923 (res.): Edward Winnington-Ingram (brother of Arthur, Bishop of London)
1923–26 December 1928 (d.): Rowland Money-Kyrle
1929–1941 (ret.): Geoffrey Iliff
1942–1958 (res.): Arthur Winnington-Ingram (son of the above Edward; afterwards archdeacon emeritus)
1959–1970 (ret.): Thomas Randolph (afterwards archdeacon emeritus)
1970–1976 (ret.): John Lewis (afterwards archdeacon emeritus)
1977–1982 (ret.): Thomas Barfett (afterwards archdeacon emeritus)
1982–1991 (ret.): Andrew Woodhouse (afterwards archdeacon emeritus)
1991–1997 (ret.): Leonard Moss (afterwards archdeacon emeritus)
1997–2002 (res.): Michael Hooper
2002–2004 (ret.): John Tiller (afterwards archdeacon emeritus)
2005–2010 (ret.): Malcolm Colmer
16 January 201131 August 2017: Paddy Benson
9 September 2018present: Derek Chedzey

Notes

References

Sources

Lists of Anglicans
Archdeacons of Hereford
Lists of English people
Archdeacon of Hereford